Leafs By Snoop is a cannabis brand owned and promoted by the rapper Snoop Dogg and produced by Canopy Growth Corporation.

History
Leafs By Snoop was launched in November 2015 in Denver, Colorado, at the home of LivWell owner John Lord, a few months after the website Merry Jane was launched.

In June 2016, it was reported that Snoop Dogg was in a trademark dispute with the Canadian ice hockey team the Toronto Maple Leafs over his Leafs by Snoop logo. By 2018, the Leafs By Snoop products were distributed in Canada by Canopy Growth Corporation, though the Canadian government had warned about celebrity endorsements of cannabis products. In February 2019, the Toronto Maple Leafs confirmed that they had filed an intellectual property lawsuit.

Description
Leafs by Snoop offers eight products:
Indica dominant: Bananas, Northern Lights, Moonbeam, Cali Kush and Purple bush
Sativa dominant: Lemon Pie, Blueberry Dream and Tangerine Man
High-CBD strain called 3D CBD

The flower is sold in eighth, quarter and 1-ounce packages.

The Atlantic noted that the carefully designed packaging by Pentagram had been designed "to make marijuana appeal to upscale consumers".

See also
Marley Natural
Willie's Reserve

References

External links

2015 establishments in Colorado
American companies established in 2015
Cannabis companies of the United States
Snoop Dogg
Agriculture companies established in 2015